Happy Accidents is a 2000 American science fiction romantic comedy film starring Marisa Tomei and Vincent D'Onofrio. The film follows Ruby Weaver, a New York City woman with a string of failed relationships, and Sam Deed, a man who claims to be from the year 2470. The film was shot almost entirely in Brooklyn, New York.

Plot
Ruby Weaver is weary of her long history of failed relationships with men when she meets Sam Deed in a park. But after the two fall in love, Ruby becomes suspicious of Sam's past, his obsession with a "Chrystie Delancey", and "causal effect". Under pressure from her, he finally explains that he is really from the year 2470 and is what he calls a "back traveler". Ruby initially ignores this story, but after Sam's persistence, she begins to wonder. She takes him to see her therapist Meg Ford. Ruby becomes worried as to Sam's sanity when he reveals that everything he has done was a deliberate attempt to change her life. In the end, both Deed and Ford turn out to be time travelers and the fatal accident that would have killed Ruby is avoided.

Cast

Reception
Happy Accidents was first shown at the Sundance Film Festival on January 25, 2000.The film later opened in limited release on August 24, 2001 to 2 screens in New York City, New York earning $14,840 on its opening weekend, and (the weekend before 9/11) reaching a widest release of 49 screens and grossing a total of $688,523 domestically in the United States.

On review aggregator website Rotten Tomatoes, the film has a 71% approval rating, based on 62 reviews with an average rating of 6.36/10. The website's critics consensus reads: "Happy Accidents has enough quirkiness and charm to rise above the more formulaic entries in the romantic comedy genre." In his review of the film Roger Ebert describes it as being "essentially silliness crossed with science fiction", giving the film a rating of 3 out of 4 stars. Ebert's co-host on Ebert & Roeper, Richard Roeper, ranked it #8 on his top ten films of the year list.

References

External links

American romantic comedy films
2000 romantic comedy films
Films shot in New York City
2000s romantic fantasy films
Films about time travel
Films directed by Brad Anderson
American romantic fantasy films
2000s English-language films
2000s American films
2000 independent films